Joseph Lloyd Reid (24 September 1917 – 14 August 2015) was a Canadian politician. He was a Progressive Conservative party member of the House of Commons of Canada. He was a lawyer by career.

Reid was president of the St. Catharines Chamber of Commerce in the mid-1960s and was the city's mayor  from 1973 to 1976. He represented the Ontario riding of St. Catharines where he was first elected in 1979. Reid was re-elected in 1980 and 1984, serving successive terms from the 31st to the 33rd Canadian Parliaments. Reid left national politics in 1988 and did not campaign in that year's federal election.

References

External links
 

1917 births
2015 deaths
Members of the House of Commons of Canada from Ontario
Progressive Conservative Party of Canada MPs
Mayors of St. Catharines